Tripodal ligands are tri- and tetradentate ligands. They are popular in research in the areas of coordination chemistry and homogeneous catalysis. Because the ligands are polydentate, they do not readily dissociate from the metal centre.  Many tripodal ligands have C3 symmetry.

Coordination chemistry
In their coordination complexes with an octahedral molecular geometry the tridentate tripod ligands occupy one face, leading to a fixed facial (or fac) geometry.  The tetradentate tripodal ligands occupy four contiguous sites, leaving two cis positions available on the octahedral metal center. When bound to four- and five-coordinate metal centres, these ligands impose C3 symmetry, which can lead to uncommon ligand field splitting patterns. Tripodal ligands are often able to coordinately saturate metal ions with lower coordination numbers.

One tripodal ligand of commercial significance is nitrilotriacetate, N(CH2CO2−)3 because it is cheaply produced and has a high affinity for divalent metal ions.  Other tripodal triamine ligands include tren (N(CH2CH2NH2)3) and cis-1,3,5-triaminocyclohexane. Certain triphosphines such as RC(CH2PPh2)3 are also tripodal.  Many kinds of donor groups have been incorporated into the arms of tripodal ligands, including amido , and N-heterocyclic carbenes.

References